Roger Zokou Boli (born 26 September 1965) is an Ivorian former professional footballer who played as a forward for clubs in the French and British leagues. He is currently a sports agent.

Career
Roger Boli started his career with AJ Auxerre, where he spent four seasons. A season at Lille OSC followed, before a long spell with RC Lens. During his seven seasons with the club, Boli won promotion to Ligue 1, and finished joint-top scorer in the 1993–94 season. A season was spent with Le Havre AC before moving to England with Walsall in 1997. Boli's twelve league goals with the Saddlers drew attention from Scottish side Dundee United and Boli moved north in a £150,000 deal in 1998. Injuries restricted him to just three league appearances, although he did score once in the Scottish League Cup against Stirling Albion, and within three months a £100,000 move saw him head to AFC Bournemouth. Boli's seven appearances would be his last before retiring in the summer of 1999.

In May 2001, Boli arranged a benefit match – Le Jubilé de Roger Boli – which saw past and present Lens players play against a team of French superstars (Zinedine Zidane, Marcel Desailly, Patrick Vieira, Eric Cantona, Jean-Pierre Papin, etc.). Lens won 7–2, with the match proceeds going to the Raoul-Follereau association.

Personal life
Boli is the brother of the French former footballer Basile Boli, and uncle of the Ivorian footballer Yannick Boli. His sons, Charles, Yohan, and Kevin are also professional footballers.

Honours
Individual
 Ligue 1 Golden Boot: 1993–94 
PFA Team of the Year: 1997–98 Second Division

See also
 Top goalscorers in Ligue 1
 Dundee United FC Season 1998-99

References

External links 
 Interview (Translated from French)
 Roger Boli information (Translated from French)
 

1965 births
Living people
Footballers from Abidjan
Association football forwards
Ivorian footballers
French footballers
France under-21 international footballers
Ivorian emigrants to France
Dundee United F.C. players
Walsall F.C. players
AFC Bournemouth players
Lille OSC players
AJ Auxerre players
Le Havre AC players
RC Lens players
Ligue 1 players
Scottish Premier League players
French expatriate footballers
Ivorian expatriate footballers
Ivorian expatriate sportspeople in Scotland
Ivorian expatriate sportspeople in England
French expatriate sportspeople in Scotland
French expatriate sportspeople in England
Expatriate footballers in Scotland
Expatriate footballers in England
Boli family